Naheda Sahtout is a biochemist currently based in Saskatchewan Canada working as a scientific analyst for the Canadian Food Inspection Agency. Sahtout moved to Canada from Malaysia in 2007 to attend the University of Waterloo for her undergraduate studies and in 2020 became a doctoral candidate in the University of Saskatchewan Chemistry Department. She is a strong activist who is very experienced as a volunteer working to engage rural communities in STEM education and resettle Syrian Refugees in Canada. Notably, Sahtout has a severe visual disability that renders her legally blind in Canada and she is very outspoken in advocating for and empowering disabled people in education. Despite her disability she has won numerous awards for her work as a researcher, educator, and activist.

Early life and education 

Sahtout grew up in Malaysia where she attended the International School of Kuala Lumpur for her entire early education and graduated high school in 2005. In 2007 she moved to Canada to begin her undergraduate studies at the University of Waterloo where she earned a BS with departmental honors in Molecular Biology and Biotechnology specialization with a minor in economics. Following her BS, Sahtout earned and MSc in Molecular and Cell Biology from the University of Guelph in 2013 and a PhD in Philosophy and Chemistry from the University of Saskatchewan in 2020. She also has a Teaching English to Speakers of Other Languages (TESOL) Diploma from the TESOL International Association.

Research and career 

Naheda Sahtout currently works as a Scientific Analyst for the Canadian Food Inspection Agency, a position she started in 2021. Prior to this she has held various research assistant and teaching positions at her attended universities. She has been a research assistant in the Janet M. Wood Laboratory where she analyzed and completed a thesis on the osmosensory protein ProP (transporter) and an assistant in the Dr. Marie Kmita Laboratory at the Institut de recherches cliniques de Montréal researching the role of Hox genes in bone development. Sahtout has been a tutorial instructor at the University of Guelph, a demonstrator and lab instructor at the University of Saskatchewan and the University of Waterloo as well as an English language teacher.

As a volunteer, Sahtout has been active in advocating for increasing diversity and accessibility in STEM education. She has been a volunteer with the organization Let's Talk Science! since 2011. Her work with this group has been focused on outreach to rural indigenous communities to help teachers and improve student engagement with Science, technology, engineering, and mathematics (STEM) subjects. She has been outspoken about not just making it more accessible but also improving the support systems in place for the students STEM is opening up for. She believes every student is too different for general policy to be effective at supporting everyone and much of this comes from her experience at ISKL where she and her teachers would plan specific courses of action for her aid. Additionally, Sahtout has been a volunteer with the Saskatoon Open Door Society since 2015. This organization works to help resettle immigrants to Canada settling in Saskatoon. Her role with this organization has been to act as a translator, mentor, conversation group host and clothing distributor to Syrian refugees.

Disability 

Sahtout has described her experience as a disabled person as challenging. She has been turned away from labs due to her disability making her unfit in the eyes of the researcher and struggled with advocating for herself for fear of being stigmatized due to her disability. She was very eager and not discouraged from pursuing a career in STEM and found ways to employ labs assistants to help her with challenging tasks. Her personal experience with self advocacy has been the driving force in her advocacy for improving STEM accessibility overall.

References 

Living people
Year of birth missing (living people)
University of Waterloo alumni
Canadian biochemists